Marcel is an Occitan form of the Ancient Roman origin male given name Marcellus, which in Latin means "Belonging to Mars". The feminine counterpart of the name is Marcelle. It is used predominantly in France, Monaco, Switzerland, Spain, Italy, Belgium, Germany, Hungary, Canada and partially in Romania.  It may refer to:

In the arts
 Marcel (singer) (Marcel Francois Chagnon) (born 1975), American country music singer and songwriter known by the singular name, Marcel
 Marcel Achard (1899–1974), French playwright and screenwriter
 Marcel Aymé (1902–1967), French author, screenwriter and playwright
 Marcel Breuer (1902–1981), Hungarian-born American modernist, architect and furniture designer
 Marcel Broodthaers (1924–1976), Belgian poet, artist and filmmaker
 Marcel Camus (1912–1982), French film director
 Marcel Carné (1906–1996), French film director
 Marcel Dadi (1951–1996), French guitarist and songwriter
 Marcel Duchamp (1887–1968), French-American artist whose work is most often associated with the Dadaist and Surrealist movements
 Marcel Dupré (1886–1971), French organist, pianist, composer and pedagogue
 Marcel Dzama (born 1974), Canadian artist known for small-scale ink and watercolor drawings
 Marcel Everett (born 1995), American electronic musician better known as XXYYXX
 Marcel Gotlib (1934–2016), French comics artist
 Marcel Theo Hall (1964–2021), American rapper better known by his stage name Biz Markie
 Marcel Iureș (born 1951), Romanian actor
 Marcel Janco (1895–1984), Israeli painter and architect
 Marcel Jouhandeau (1888–1979), French writer
 Marcel Khalife (born 1950), Lebanese composer, singer and oud player
 Marcel L'Herbier (1888–1979), French filmmaker
 Marcel Moyse (1889–1984), French flutist
 Marcel Mule (1901–2001), French classical saxophonist
 Marcel Neels (1922–2016), Belgian cartoonist known as "Marc Sleen"
 Marcel Olinescu (1896–1992), Romanian engraver
 Marcel Pagnol (1895–1975), French novelist, playwright and filmmaker
 Marcel Khalife (born 1950), Lebanese-French composer, singer and oud player
 Marcel Marceau (1923–2007), French mime artist and actor
 Marcel Martí (born 1925), Argentine-born sculptor of Catalan descent
 Marcel Poot (1901–1988), Belgian composer and music educator
 Marcel Proust (1871–1922), French novelist, essayist, and critic
 Marcel Rodríguez-López (born 1984), member of The Mars Volta and younger brother of Omar Rodriguez-Lopez
 Marcel Romanescu (1897–1956), Romanian poet
 Marcel Schwob (1867–1905), Jewish French symbolist writer
 Marcel Vaid, (born 1967) Swiss film composer

In sports 
 Marcel (footballer, born August 1981), Marcel Silva Andrade, Brazilian midfielder
 Marcel (footballer, born November 1981), Marcel Augusto Ortolan, Brazilian striker
 Marcel (footballer, born 1983), Marcel Silva Cardoso, Brazilian left back
 Marcel (footballer, born 1992), Marcel Henrique Garcia Alves Pereira, Brazilian midfielder
 Marcel Balkestein (born 1981), Dutch field hockey player
 Marcel Barthel (born 1990), German professional wrestler
 Marcel "Marco" van Basten (born 1964), Dutch football player and coach
 Marcel Buysse (1889–1939), Belgian racing cyclist
 Marcel Cerdan (1916–1949), French pied noir world boxing champion
 Marcel Comeau (born 1952), Canadian ice hockey coach and NHL executive
 Marcel Coraș (born 1959), Romanian footballer
 Marcell Dareus (born 1990), NFL defensive tackle
 Marcel Desailly (born 1968), French footballer
 Marcel Dionne (born 1931), Canadian ice hockey player
 Marcel Dost (born 1969), retired decathlete from the Netherlands
 Marcel Felder (born 1984), Uruguayan tennis player
 Marcel Henrique Garcia Alves Pereira (born 1992), Brazilian footballer known as Marcel
 Marcel Goc (born 1983), German professional ice hockey player
 Marcel Granollers (born 1986), Spanish tennis player
 Marcel Hirscher (born 1989), Austrian alpine skier
 Marcel Hossa (born 1981), Slovak professional ice hockey player
 Marcell Jansen (born 1985), German footballer
 Marcel Kint (1914–2002), Belgian racing cyclist
 Marcel Kittel (born 1988), German racing cyclist
 Marcel Nguyen (born 1987), Vietnamese-German gymnast
 Marcel Augusto Ortolan, Brazilian football player
 Marcel Ponitka (born 1997), Polish basketball player
 Marcel Sabitzer (born 1994), Austrian footballer
 Marcel Schäfer (born 1984), German footballer
 Marcel Schmelzer (born 1988), German footballer
 Marcel Seip (born 1982), Dutch footballer
 Marcel Spears Jr. (born 1997), American football player
 Marcel Toader (1963–2019), Romanian rugby union player
 Marcel Wouda (born 1972), Dutch swimmer
 Marcel Wyss (born 1986), Swiss road cyclist

In other fields
 Marcel Alessandri (1895–1968), French Army general
 Marcel Berlins (1941–2019), Anglo-French lawyer, legal commentator, broadcaster, and columnist
 Marcel Alexandre Bertrand (1847–1907), French geologist
 Marcel Bich (1914–1994), French manufacturer of ballpoint pens
 Marcel Bigeard (1916–2010), French Army general
 Marcel Bouyer (1920–2000), French politician
 Marcel Cachin (1869–1958), Breton politician, director of the communist newspaper L'Humanité
 Marcel Carpentier (1895–1977), French Army general
 Marcel Ciolacu (born 1967), Romanian politician
 Marcel Desjardins (1941–2003), Canadian journalist, news editor and director
 Marcel Dinu (born 1935), Romanian diplomat
 Marcel Dassault (1892–1986), French aircraft industrialist
 Marcel Deprez (1843–1918), French electrical engineer
 Marcel Deviq (1907–1972), French engineer, businessman, and politician
 Marcel Grateau (1852–1936), French hairdresser who pioneered the use of hair irons
 Marcel Griaule (1898–1956), French anthropologist
 Marcel Grossmann (1878–1936), Hungarian-Swiss mathematician
 Marcel Gumbs (born 1953), Dutch Prime Minister of Sint Maarten
 Marcel Ichac (1906–1994), French alpinist, explorer, photographer and film director
 Marcel Lefebvre (1905–1991), French Roman Catholic archbishop
 Marcel Mauss (1872–1950), French ethnologist
 Marcel Minnaert (1893–1970), Dutch astronomer of Flemish origin
 Marcel Olteanu (1872–1943), Romanian general
 Marcel Ophüls (born 1927), German-born American documentary film maker
 Marcel Pauker (1896–1938), Romanian communist militant
 Marcel Peyrouton (1887–1983), French diplomat and politician.
 Marcel Pilet-Golaz (1889–1958), Swiss politician
 Marcel Rayman (1923−1944), Polish Jew in the FTP-MOI group of French resistance fighters during World War II
 Marcel Reich-Ranicki (1920–2013), Polish-born German literary critic
 Marcel Renault (1871 or 1872–1903), French racing car driver and industrialist
 Marcel Riesz (1886–1969), Hungarian-born Swedish mathematician
 Marcel Toussaint Terfve (1893–1918), Belgian corporal 
 Marcel Trillat (born 1940), French journalist and documentary filmmaker
 Marcel Vigneron (born 1980), American chef and television personality
 Marcel Vonk, Dutch poker player and physicist
 Marcel Vos, Dutch YouTuber

In fiction
 Marcel, a villain in the anime Yu-Gi-Oh! GX
 Marcel, Ross Geller's pet monkey in the television series Friends
 Marcel, a fictional marketer in the music video of "Best Song Ever" by One Direction
 Marcel, a villager in the video game series Animal Crossing
 Marcel Gerard, a character in The Originals
Marcel Galliard, a character in the Attack on Titan manga and anime.

See also

French masculine given names
Romanian masculine given names
Catalan masculine given names
Dutch masculine given names

fr:Marcel
ko:마르셀
pt:Marcel